Marcelo Arévalo and Miguel Ángel Reyes-Varela were the defending champions but chose not to defend their title.

Nicolás Jarry and Roberto Quiroz won the title after defeating Nicolás Barrientos and Alejandro Gómez 6–7(4–7), 7–5, [10–4] in the final.

Seeds

Draw

References

External links
 Main draw

Open Bogotá - Doubles
2021 Doubles